Woolston is the name of two rural settlements in Shropshire, England:
 Woolston, north Shropshire, near Oswestry
 Woolston, south Shropshire, near Church Stretton and Craven Arms